Dollens is a surname. Notable people with the surname include:

 Mickey Dollens (born 1987), American politician, nonprofit executive, author, and educator
 Morris Scott Dollens (1920–1994), American artist and science fiction writer

See also
 Dolenz